The 2023 UCI Europe Tour is the nineteenth season of the UCI Europe Tour.

Throughout the season, points are awarded to the top finishers of stages within stage races and the final general classification standings of each of the stages races and one-day events. The quality and complexity of a race also determines how many points are awarded to the top finishers, the higher the UCI rating of a race, the more points are awarded.

The UCI ratings from highest to lowest are as follows:
 Multi-day events: 2.Pro, 2.1 and 2.2
 One-day events: 1.Pro, 1.1 and 1.2

Events

January

February

March

April

May

June

July

August

September

October

References

External links 
 

 
UCI Europe Tour
2023 in men's road cycling
2023 in European sport
Europe